The piri is a Korean double reed instrument, used in both the folk and classical (court) music of Korea. Originating in Central Asia, it was introduced to the Korean peninsula from China, and has been used there as early as the Three Kingdoms period, most notably in the states of Goguryeo and Baekje. The instrument consists of a tube of bamboo, which is perforated with finger holes, and has a large double reed. Its cylindrical bore gives it a sound mellower than that of many other types of oboe.

A typical piri has eight finger holes, seven of which are on the front, with the remaining one on the back for the thumb.

There are four types of piri:
Hyang piri
Se piri
Dang piri
Dae piri

There are different types of piri, each suited for use in a different type of music. The Hyang piri is the longest and most common form of piri. Because of its loud and nasal tone, it usually plays the main melody in an ensemble. The se piri is the smaller, thinner, and much quieter one. Additionally, because of its quiet tone, it is used along with voices or soft stringed instruments. The Dang piri (Tang piri) is wider and is similar to the Chinese guanzi. Additionally, the North Korean dae piri is a modernized piri with keys and a bell, looking much more like a western oboe.

In general, the method of playing the piri is to sit upright, pull the chin slightly, straighten the back to make it easier to breathe, hold the flute in both hands, and bite it in mouth.

The piri is believed to have been introduced to Korea from Kucha, a Buddhist oasis state of Central Asia (modern-day Xinjiang) before the Goguryeo period.  According to the Book of Sui, the piri was also known as gagwan, and it originates from Kucha.  During the reign of King Yejong of Goryeo dynasty, another double-reed cylindrical instrument was imported from Song dynasty China, and to disambiguate, the former was named hyang piri and the latter dang piri.  The se piri is smaller than the hyang piri, but has the same structure and range. The se piri appears to have been invented much later than the hyang piri.

The piri'''s equivalent in China is the guan (also known as bili), and its counterpart in Japan is the hichiriki''.

See also
Traditional Korean musical instruments

References

Korean musical instruments
Single oboes with cylindrical bore